Aloysius Vincent (14 June 1928 – 25 February 2015) was an Indian cinematographer and director known for his works in Malayalam, Tamil, Telugu and Hindi language films. From the mid-1960s on, he directed some 30 movies including the landmark Malayalam films Bhargavi Nilayam, and Murappennu. 

He received the Filmfare Best Cinematographer Award for Prem Nagar (1974) starring Rajesh Khanna. In 2003, the Indian Society of Cinematographers (ISC) awarded him an Honorary Membership, along with K. K. Mahajan and V. K. Murthy. He received the J. C. Daniel Award in 1996.

Biography 
Vincent was born in 1928 in Calicut, then part of Madras Presidency.
He was trained under cinematographer Kamal Ghosh and was initially associated with Gemini Studios. He started his career in Tamil cinema and shot to fame with the Sivaji Ganesan-starrer Uthamaputhiran. Vincent teamed up with C. V. Sridhar in masterpieces such as Kalyana Parisu, Nenjil Or Aalayam, Kaadhalikka Neramillai, Sumaithaangi and Then Nilavu. He then became a freelancer and achieved success in Malayalam and Telugu films. He established himself as one of the leading cinematographers in South India and also earned a name in Hindi films. At a time when cinematography was in its infancy in Indian cinema, he experimented with camera angles and placements. He succeeded in bringing in the kind of visuals that were not seen before in South Indian films.
In 2003, the Indian Society of Cinematographers (ISC) awarded him an Honorary Membership, along with K. K. Mahajan and V. K. Murthy.

Vincent has directed around 30 films, mostly in Malayalam. The first Malayalam film he directed, Bhargavi Nilayam (1964), was scripted by renowned writer Vaikom Muhammad Basheer. It is considered one of the all time classics in Malayalam cinema and the soundtrack to this film was also a notable success. Few directors could claim such an impressive list of chart-toppers and some of the Malayalam feature films directed by Vincent are Murappennu, Nadhi, Gandharvakshethram, Thulabharam, Aswamedham, Achani, Anaavaranam, Aalmaram, Thriveni, Nagarame Nandi, Abhijathyam, Asuravithu, Kochu Themmadi, Nizhalattam, Chenda, Sreekrishna Parunthu, Priyamulla Sophia, Nakhangal and Theerthayathra.
Vincent died on 25 February 2015 at the age of 86. His sons Jayanan Vincent and Ajayan Vincent are also cinematographers

Filmography

As cinematographer

Annamayya (film) (1997) Telugu (Cinematographer)
Sahasa Veerudu Sagara Kanya (1996) Telugu (Cinematographer)
Bobbili Simham (1994) Telugu (Cinematographer)
Major Chandrakanth (1993) Telugu (Cinematographer)
Allari Priyudu (1993) Telugu (Cinematographer)
Aswamedham (1992 film) (1992) Telugu (Cinematographer)
Aapathbandhavudu (1992) Telugu (Cinematographer)
Gharana Mogudu (1992) Telugu (Cinematographer)
Uncle Bun (1991) Malayalam (Special Effects Cinematographer)
Gnana Paravai (1991) Tamil (Cinematographer)
Alludugaru (1990) Telugu (Guest Cinematographer)
Nari Nari Naduma Murari (1990) Telugu (Cinematographer)
Dharma Kshetram (1990) Telugu (Cinematographer)
Douthyam (1988) Malayalam (Special Effects Cinematographer)
Aanandha Kummi (1983) Tamil (Cinematographer)
Mahaan (1983) Hindi (Cinematographer)
Bandish (film) (1981) Hindi (Cinematographer)
Ashajyothi (1981) Telugu (Cinematographer)
Guru (1980) Tamil / Telugu (Guest Director / Cinematographer)
Ilamai Kolam (1979) Tamil (Cinematographer)
Aana Paachan (1978) Malayalam (Director)
K D No. 1 (1978) Telugu (Cinematographer)
Rajaputhra Rahasyamu (1978) Telugu (Cinematographer)
Vayanadan Thampan (1978) Malayalam (Director)
Radhakrishna (1978) Telugu (Cinematographer)
Gadusu Pillodu (1977) Telugu (Cinematographer)
Prema Lekhalu (1977) Telugu (Cinematographer)
Adavi Ramudu (1977) Telugu (Cinematographer)
Secretary (1976) Telugu (Cinematographer)
Jyothi (1976) Telugu (Cinematographer)
Rojavin Raja (1976) Tamil (Cinematographer)
Soggadu (1975) Telugu (Cinematographer)
Babu (1975) Telugu (Cinematographer)
Avan Oru Sarithiram (1975) Tamil (Cinematographer)
Akkaraipachai (1974) Tamil (Cinematographer)
Prem Nagar (1974) Hindi (Cinematographer)
Vasantha Maligai (1973) Tamil (Cinematographer)
Savaale Samali (1971) Tamil (Cinematographer)
Iru Thuruvam (1971) Tamil (Cinematographer)
Ek Nari Ek Brahmachari(1971) Hindi (Cinematographer)
Gauravam (1973 film) (1973) Tamil (Cinematographer)
Madhavi (1969 film) (1969) Hindi (Cinematographer)
Adimai Penn (1969) Tamil (Guest Cinematographer)
Thunaivan (1969) Tamil (Special Effects Cinematographer)
Meherbaan (1967) Hindi (Cinematographer)
Bhaktha Prahalada(1967) Telugu (Cinematographer) Eastman Color
Letha Manasulu (1966) Telugu (Cinematographer)
Kunjali Marakkar (1966) Malayalam (Guest Cinematographer)
Enga Veettu Pillai (1965) Tamil (Cinematographer) Eastman Color
Rajamalli (1965) Malayalam (Cinematographer)
Thacholi Othenan  (film) (1964) Malayalam (Director of Photography)
Kadhalikka Neramillai (1964) Tamil (Cinematographer) Eastman Color
Moodupadam (1963) Malayalam (Cinematographer)
Dil Ek Mandir (1963) Hindi (Cinematographer)
Nenjam Marappathillai (1963) Tamil (Cinematographer)
Sumaithaangi (1962) Tamil (Cinematographer)
Policekaran Magal (1962) Tamil (Cinematographer)
Kula Gotralu (1962) Telugu (Cinematographer)
Punar Jenmam (1961) Tamil (Cinematographer)
Then Nilavu (1961) Tamil (Cinematographer)
Nazrana (1961) Hindi (Cinematographer)
Nenjil Or Aalayam (1961) Tamil (Cinematographer)
Mudiyanaya Puthran (1961) Malayalam (Cinematographer)
Meenda Sorgam (1960) Tamil (Cinematographer)
Ellorum Innattu Mannar (1960) Tamil (Cinematographer)
Vidivelli (1960) Tamil (Cinematographer)
Pelli Kanuka (1960 film) (1960) Telugu (Cinematographer)
Illarikam (1959) Telugu (Cinematographer)
Kalyana Parisu (1959) Tamil (Cinematographer)
Uthamaputhiran (1958) Tamil (Cinematographer)
Amar Deep (1958) Hindi (Cinematographer)
Yaar Paiyyan (1957) Tamil (Cinematographer)
Sontha Ooru (1956) Telugu (Cinematographer)
Amaradeepam (1956) Tamil (Cinematographer)
Neelakuyil (1954) Malayalam (Cinematographer. Debut as independent cinematographer.)
Chandirani (1953) Telugu (Guest Cinematographer)

As director 

Kochu Themmadi (1986) Malayalam
Pournami Raavil 3D (1985) Malayalam
Sreekrishna Parunthu (1984) Malayalam
Ponnum Poovum (1983) Malayalam
Theeram Thedunna Thira (1983) Malayalam
Aana Paachan (1978) Malayalam
Naam Pirandha Mann (1977) Tamil
Anaavaranam (1976) Malayalam
Priyamulla Sophia (1975) Malayalam
Thirumangalyam (1974) Tamil
Achani (1973) Malayalam
Chenda (film) (1973) Malayalam
Dharmayudham (1973) Malayalam
Nakhangal (1973) Malayalam
Gandharava Kshetram (1972) Malayalam
Theertha Yathra (1972) Malayalam
Aabhijathyam (1971) Malayalam
Iru Veedugal (1970) Tamil
Nizhalattam (1970) Malayalam
Thriveni (1970) Malayalam Eastman Color
Thulabharam (1969) Malayalam
Aalmaram (1969) Malayalam
Nadi (1969) Malayalam Eastman Color
Asuravithu (1968) Malayalam
Thulabharam (1968) Malayalam
Ashwamedham (1967) Malayalam
Engalukkum Kalam Varum (1967) Tamil
Nagarame Nandi (1967) Malayalam
Murappennu (1965) Malayalam
Bhargavi Nilayam (1964) Malayalam

Awards
Nandi Awards
 Best Cinematographer - Adavi Ramudu (1977)
 Best Cinematographer - Annamayya
13th Prem Nazir Award

References

External links 

Malayalam film directors
2015 deaths
1928 births
Kerala State Film Award winners
Indian Christians
Cinematographers from Kerala
Malayalam film cinematographers
Filmfare Awards winners
Artists from Kozhikode
Tamil film directors
Tamil film cinematographers
Telugu film cinematographers
Filmfare Awards South winners
20th-century Indian film directors
20th-century Indian photographers
Film directors from Kerala
J. C. Daniel Award winners